Pleurodema somuncurense (the Somuncura frog or El Rincon stream frog, in Spanish rana de Somuncura) is a species of frog in the family Leptodactylidae. It is endemic to the Somuncura Plateau in Patagonia, Argentina.

Description
Females reach  in total length. They are slender with fairly small head and large protruding, gold-coloured eyes. Fingers and toes are long and slender, with the toes being about one-third webbed. Eyes have two symmetrical rounded structures on the centre of the upper and lower border of the iris. The skin is smooth. Colouration is bright yellowish-brown on the upper surfaces of the head, body and legs. There are irregular dark spots across the back, and wavy dark reticulated lines on the sides of the body and backs of the thighs. There is a characteristic yellowish stripe that runs centrally down the top of the head and half of the back. The belly is purplish-yellow with dark grey reticulated spots. The lower surface of the thighs is purplish-rose and bears faint grey reticulated spots.

Habitat and conservation
Pleurodema somuncurense is a fully aquatic frog that inhabits geothermal springs and streams. It is threatened by predation by introduced rainbow trout and by habitat loss from canalization of spring water. Also livestock farming has negative impacts through overgrazing and chemical pollution. The grassland fires used to promote regrowth of pasture for livestock impact the frogs availability of shelters, reproductive sites, and terrestrial preys. [4]

References

External links
 

Pleurodema
Amphibians described in 1969
Amphibians of Patagonia
Amphibians of Argentina
Endemic fauna of Argentina
EDGE species
Taxonomy articles created by Polbot
Taxa named by José Miguel Alfredo María Cei